is a Japanese speed skater. He competed in the 2018 Winter Olympics.

References

1992 births
Living people
Speed skaters at the 2018 Winter Olympics
Speed skaters at the 2022 Winter Olympics
Japanese male speed skaters
Olympic speed skaters of Japan
Asian Games medalists in speed skating
Speed skaters at the 2017 Asian Winter Games
Asian Games gold medalists for Japan
Asian Games silver medalists for Japan
Medalists at the 2017 Asian Winter Games